Dante Henderson (sometimes credited as Dante Lamar Henderson) is a singer, songwriter, dancer, choreographer, model and actor.

Henderson and his family moved to California when he was about 2 years old. Raised in Los Angeles, Dante studied the arts at Hollywood High School before receiving a scholarship to the California Institute of the Arts.

Henderson began his professional career as a dancer working with Debbie Allen on the 63rd Annual Academy Awards (he went on to assist Ms. Allen on the 64th and 65th shows in addition to dancing). As a dancer Dante has worked alongside well-known musical artists as Michael Jackson, Whitney Houston, Jason Mraz, TLC and Mary J. Blige. He has choreographed and assisted on music videos and live stage shows for Deborah Cox, Erin Hamilton, Shaggy, Janet Jackson, Kristine W, and Niki Harris (known for her background vocals for Madonna). As a model, Dante posed for Herb Ritts in a Levi's campaign shot entirely in Africa. He also worked as a gogo dancer in Tokyo during the 1990s.

Though primarily known as a dancer, Dante has also worked in movies with Robin Williams, Adam Sandler, Will Ferrell, Shirley MacLaine, and Rob Schneider. His movie credits include, I Now Pronounce You Chuck and Larry, Semi Pro, The Birdcage, Big Stan, These Old Broads, and Gun Shy.

External links

References 

1969 births
American singer-songwriters
American male singer-songwriters
Living people